The Night Heaven Fell (Les bijoutiers du clair de lune) is an Eastmancolor 1958 French-Italian film directed by Roger Vadim. Vadim had already acquired international fame with his daring debut And God Created Woman (1956). Like its predecessor, The Night Heaven Fell explored the exuberant sensuality of Brigitte Bardot, who was Vadim's wife at the time.

Plot
Set in rural Spain, Ursula (Brigitte Bardot), is a young girl who has just left a convent and has moved in with her aunt Florentine and her violent husband, the count Ribera (José Nieto). Ribera wants to see Lambert (Stephen Boyd), a young man from the village, dead. Ursula quickly falls in love with Lambert. In a confrontation between the two, Lambert kills Ribera in self-defense.

The reason for the conflict soon becomes clear to Ursula: he was having an affair with her aunt. However, when Florentine (Alida Valli) discovers her lover has no intention of making any commitment to her, she refuses to confirm Lambert's alibi to the police and forces him into becoming a fugitive. Ursula, always impulsive, runs off with him and together they seek a way to get him safely out of the country. While evading the police, the lovers take refuge in the gorge known as El Chorro.

Lambert contacts Florentine, who agrees to help them complete their escape. But at the rendezvous back in town, the police spot Florentine's car and become suspicious. A policeman spots Lambert up the street in the village. Against Lambert's protests, Ursula runs up the street towards him. After issuing warning shots, the policeman shoots several rounds up the street, mortally wounding Ursula in the back as she stands in front of Lambert, who is unhit. He holds her in a doorway, and as she dies, they declare their love for each other, just before she falls dead on the ground.

Cast
Brigitte Bardot as Ursula
Alida Valli as Florentine
Stephen Boyd as Lambert
José Nieto as Comte Miguel de Ribera 
Fernando Rey as Tío
Maruchi Fresno as Conchita 
Adriano Domínguez as Fernando
José Marco Davó Le chef de la police

Reception
On review aggregator website Rotten Tomatoes the film has an approval rating of 20% based on 5 critics, with an average rating of 4.60/10.

Nathan Rabin of The A.V. Club said this about the restored version of the film: "The Night Heaven Fell still leaves much to be desired artistically, this new transfer is a crisp, vivid marvel that gives an interesting but tremendously flawed film better treatment than it probably deserves".

The DVD version of the film was released on 19 September 2001. Rich Rosell of Digitally Obsessed, who reviewed it, gave it a "C+".

References

External links

French crime drama films
Italian crime drama films
1958 films
CinemaScope films
1958 crime drama films
Films directed by Roger Vadim
Films set in Spain
Films scored by Georges Auric
Films shot in Almería
1950s Italian films
1950s French films